Robert Archer Wilson Jr. (June 9, 1913 – March 31, 2003) was an American politician and civic activist from Richmond, Virginia. He was a member of the Richmond Charter Commission, which drafted the city's City Manager Charter in 1948. He was elected to City Council and later vice-mayor. He was president of the Richmond Jaycees and was rector of the Board of Visitors of Virginia Commonwealth University.

References

1913 births
2003 deaths
People from Richmond, Virginia
20th-century American politicians